is a Japanese footballer currently playing as a midfielder for Fujieda MYFC as a designated special player.

Career statistics

Club
.

Notes

References

1999 births
Living people
Association football people from Aichi Prefecture
Chukyo University alumni
Japanese footballers
Association football midfielders
J3 League players
Fujieda MYFC players